The Peace River Suspension Bridge was a bridge near Taylor, British Columbia, Canada, crossing the Peace River. It opened in 1943 and collapsed on October 16, 1957, with no injuries or fatalities recorded. When it opened, it was the longest bridge on the Alaska highway at 2,130 feet. When it collapsed, traffic was detoured over the railroad trestle. It has since been replaced by the Peace River Bridge.

References

External links
 Film of the official opening of the bridge on August 30th 1943
 1950 home movie of the bridge

Bridge disasters in Canada
Bridges completed in 1943
Suspension bridges in Canada
Road bridges in British Columbia
1957 disasters in Canada